Acacia resinistipulea is a shrub or tree of the genus Acacia and the subgenus Plurinerves that is endemic to an area of south western Australia.

Description
Like most species of Acacia it has phyllodes rather than true leaves. It blooms from September to November and produces yellow flowers.

Taxonomy
The species was first formally described by the botanist William Vincent Fitzgerald in 1904 as a part of the work Additions to the West Australian Flora as published in the Journal of the West Australian Natural History Society. It was reclassified as Racosperma resinistipuleum by Leslie Pedley in 2003 then transferred back to genus Acacia in 2006. The only other synonym is Acacia resinostipulea.
The plant superficially resembles Acacia formidabilis.

Distribution
It is native to an area in the Wheatbelt  and Goldfields-Esperance regions of Western Australia where it is commonly situated around salt lakes, on undulating plains and in low lying areas growing in gravelly sandy or loam or clay loam soils. It has a scattered distribution from around Yellowdine and Coolgardie in the north down to around Boingaring Rocks in the south as a part of open scrubland or Eucalyptus woodland communities where it is often associated with Melaleuca uncinata.

See also
 List of Acacia species

References

resinistipulea
Acacias of Western Australia
Taxa named by William Vincent Fitzgerald
Plants described in 1904